The Kimmswick Limestone is an Ordovician geologic formation in Arkansas, Illinois and Missouri. Fossils occurring in the Kimmswick include corals, bryozoans, brachiopods, conodonts, trilobites, crinoids and mollusks.

Fossil content 
The following fossils have been reported from the formation:

Conodonts 

 Acodus
 A. unicostatus
 Acontiodus
 A. alveolaris
 Ambalodus
 A. elegans
 A. pulcher
 A. triangularis
 Aphelognathus
 A. abrupta
 A. polita
 Belodina
 B. compressa
 Cordylodus
 C. delicatus
 C. flexuosus
 Dichognathus
 D. brevis
 D. scotti
 D. typica
 Distacodus
 D. falcatus
 Drepanodus
 D. homocurvatus
 D. suberectus
 Eoligonodina
 E. delicata
 Icriodella
 I. superba
 Keislognathus
 K. gracilis
 Oistodus
 O. abundans
 O. inclinatus
 O. parallelus
 Ozarkodina
 O. concinna
 Panderodus
 P. compressus
 P. ellisoni
 P. fornicalis
 P. gracilis
 P. simplex
 Phragmodus
 P. undatus
 Prioniodina
 P. furcata
 Rhynchognathodus
 R. divaricatus
 R. typicus
 Sagittodontus
 S. robustus
 Scolopodus
 S. insculptus
 Tetraprioniodus
 T. superbus
 Trichonodella
 T. exacta
 Zygognathus
 Z. curvata
 Z. mira

Trilobites
 Eobronteus
 E. slocomi

See also 

 List of fossiliferous stratigraphic units in Arkansas
 List of fossiliferous stratigraphic units in Illinois
 List of fossiliferous stratigraphic units in Missouri

References 

Ordovician Arkansas
Ordovician Illinois
Ordovician Missouri
Katian
Sandbian
Limestone formations of the United States
Ordovician southern paleotemperate deposits
Paleontology in Illinois
Paleontology in Missouri